Sarah McAuley may refer to:
 Sarah McAuley (bowls)
 Sarah McAuley (field hockey)